Crash or CRASH may refer to:

Common meanings
 Collision, an impact between two or more objects
 Crash (computing), a condition where a program ceases to respond
 Cardiac arrest, a medical condition in which the heart stops beating
 Couch surfing, temporarily staying at another person's home
 Gate crashing, the act of entering an event without invitation
 Stock market crash, a sudden dramatic decline of stock prices

Arts and entertainment

Film
 The Crash (1932 film), a drama starring Ruth Chatterton
 Crash (1974 film), a Norwegian drama directed by Rolf Clemens 
 Crash!, a 1977 suspense drama starring José Ferrer and Sue Lyon 
 Crash (1978 film), a made-for-TV docudrama starring William Shatner and Adrienne Barbeau
  Crash: The Mystery of Flight 1501, a 1990 made-for-TV film starring Cheryl Ladd
 Crash (1996 film), a drama directed by David Cronenberg
 Crash (2004 film), directed by Paul Haggis and winner of the 2005 Academy Award for Best Picture
 The Crash (2017 film), a thriller directed by Aram Rappaport

Television
 Crash (1984 TV series), a Danish science-fiction series
 Crash (2008 TV series), an American drama based on the 2004 film
 Crash (2009 TV series), an English-language Welsh medical drama series
 Çarpışma, a 2018-19 Turkish TV series

Publications
 Crash (J. G. Ballard novel), the basis of the 1996 film
 Crash (magazine), dedicated to the ZX Spectrum home computer and published from 1984 to 1991
 Crash (Spinelli novel), by Jerry Spinelli, 1996)
 Crash Magazine, a French independent magazine
 Crash! (manga), a 2007 manga series by Yuka Fujiwara

Music

Bands
 Crash (South Korean band), a thrash metal band, who formed in 1991 from Seoul
 Crash (UK band), an indie rock band, from New York in the 1980s

Albums
 Crash (Billy "Crash" Craddock album) (1976)
 Crash (Dave Matthews Band album) (1996)
 Crash (Decyfer Down album) (2009)
 Crash (The Human League album) (1986)
 Crash! (album), by guitarist Kenny Burrell (1963)
 Crash (Charli XCX album) (2022)

Songs
 "Crash" (Cavo song) (2009)
 "Crash" (Feeder song) (1997)
 "Crash" (The Primitives song) (1988)
 "Crash" (Royseven song) (2007)
 "Crash" (Gwen Stefani song) (2006)
 "Crash" (Have Some Fun), by TKA featuring Michelle Visage (1990)
 "Crash" (Usher song) (2016)
 "Crash", by Baboon from Something Good Is Going to Happen to You, 2002
 "Crash" by Delta Goodrem on her album Bridge Over Troubled Dreams 2021

Fictional characters
 Crash Bandicoot (character), the primary protagonist in the video game series of the same name

Video games
 Burnout Crash!, a spin-off of the Burnout series
 Crash Bandicoot, a series of adventure video games
Crash Bandicoot (video game), the first game of the series
 Hot Wheels: Crash!, a video game released in 1999 for Microsoft Windows

Card games
 Crash (card game), a British card game
 CRASH convention, a convention in the game of contract bridge

People
 Crash (graffiti artist), American artist John Matos (born 1961)
 Ray "Crash" Corrigan (1902–1976), American actor
 Billy "Crash" Craddock (born 1939), country music singer
 Darby Crash (1958–1980), punk rock musician
 Crash Davis (1919-2001), American baseball player who inspired the name of the movie character
 Crash Holly and Crash, ring names of American professional wrestler Mike Lockwood (1971–2003)

Sports teams
 Indy Crash, a women's full contact football team in the Women's Football Alliance
 Iowa City Crash, a team in the Midwest Rugby League

Other uses
 Crash (genus), a genus of fossil bandicoots published in 2014
 Crash cymbal, used in occasional drumming accents
 HMS Crash, British Royal Navy vessels
 Sugar crash, a supposed sense of fatigue after consuming a large number of carbohydrates
 Community Resources Against Street Hoodlums (CRASH), a unit of the Los Angeles Police Department
 Crash, (herd) of rhinoceroses
 Crash (fabric), a plain linen fabric used for towels
 Crash, slang for a drug comedown

See also
 Crash course (disambiguation)
 The Crash (disambiguation)
 
 
 "Crashed", a song by Daughtry
 Crasher (Gobots), several fictional characters in the Gobots toyline and cartoon, and Transformers series
 Crashing (disambiguation)